Macrancylus is a genus of beetle in family Curculionidae. It contains the following species:
 Macrancylus linearis (extinct)

References 

Cossoninae
Taxonomy articles created by Polbot